Knut Henrik Spets (born 7 November 1982 in Trondheim) is a Norwegian professional ice hockey player, who is currently a free agent. He is the older brother of fellow Norwegian international Lars Erik Spets

Club career

Early career
He started his career with Lillehammer in the 2000–01 GET-ligaen season, and Trondheim Black Panthers in the 2001–02 season, before moving to Storhamar Dragons before the 2002–03 season.

Moving abroad
In 2006, he signed with the Swedish team Arboga in HockeyAllsvenskan, where he played 40 matches before moving to Nyköping.

Back home
23 May 2008, Spets decided to move back to Norway and play for Vålerenga Ishockey. Four months later he got united with his younger brother, Lars Erik Spets, when he signed for the same club. In the 2009–10 GET-ligaen season, he finished fourth in the point statistics.

International career
Spets played for the Norwegian national team during the 2007 and 2010 IIHF World Championships. He has also played in national youth teams from the age of 17.

References

External links

1982 births
Living people
Norwegian ice hockey forwards
Norwegian expatriate ice hockey people
IFK Arboga IK players
Lillehammer IK players
Lørenskog IK players
Storhamar Dragons players
Trondheim Black Panthers players
Vålerenga Ishockey players
Nyköpings Hockey players
Sportspeople from Trondheim